Puma Qaqa (Quechua puma cougar, puma, qaqa rock, "cougar rock", Hispanicized spelling Pumacaca) is a mountain in the Cusco Region in the Andes of Peru, about  high. It is situated in the Canchis Province, on the border of the districts of Checacupe and Pitumarca. Puma Qaqa lies northwest of Chupika.

References

Mountains of Peru
Mountains of Cusco Region